The Jack River is a perennial river of the Snowy River catchment, located in the East Gippsland region of the Australian state of Victoria.

Course and features
The Jack River rises in a state forestry area northwest of Murrungowa and flows generally southeast, joined by the Rocky River and one minor tributary before reaching its confluence with the Brodribb River, within the Brodribb Flora Reserve in the Shire of East Gippsland. The river descends  over its  course.

The catchment area of the river is administered by the East Gippsland Catchment Management Authority.

See also

 List of rivers of Australia

References

External links
 
 
 

East Gippsland catchment
Rivers of Gippsland (region)